Merissa Smith (born 11 November 1990) is an association football player who represented New Zealand at international level.

Smith made her full Football Ferns debut in a 0–3 loss to China on 14 November 2006, and represented New Zealand at the 2007 FIFA Women's World Cup finals in China, where they lost to Brazil 0–5, Denmark (0–2) and China (0–2).

Smith was also included in the New Zealand squad for the 2008 Summer Olympics where they drew with Japan (2–2) before losing to Norway (0–1) and Brazil (0–4).

She appeared in a group game for New Zealand at the 2006 Women's U-20 World Cup finals, and again represented the young ferns at the 2008 Women's U-20 World Cup in Chile.

References

External links
 

1990 births
Living people
New Zealand women's international footballers
New Zealand women's association footballers
Olympic association footballers of New Zealand
Footballers at the 2008 Summer Olympics
Sportspeople from Tauranga
Women's association football forwards
2007 FIFA Women's World Cup players